Wu Kuo-an is a Taiwanese politician.

He was chief secretary of the Public Construction Commission prior to accepting an appointment as deputy minister of the body in February 2012. Wu was succeeded as deputy minister by Chen Chwen-jing in May 2012.

References

Year of birth missing (living people)
Living people
Government ministers of Taiwan